Actinium (89Ac) has no stable isotopes and no characteristic terrestrial isotopic composition, thus a standard atomic weight cannot be given. There are 33 known isotopes, from 204Ac to 236Ac, and 7 isomers. Three isotopes are found in nature, 225Ac, 227Ac and 228Ac, as intermediate decay products of, respectively, 237Np, 235U, and 232Th. 228Ac and 225Ac are extremely rare, so almost all natural actinium is 227Ac.

The most stable isotopes are 227Ac with a half-life of 21.772 years, 225Ac with a half-life of 10.0 days, and 226Ac with a half-life of 29.37 hours. All other isotopes have half-lives under 10 hours, and most under a minute. The shortest-lived known isotope is 217Ac with a half-life of 69 ns.

Purified 227Ac comes into equilibrium with its decay products (227Th and 223Fr) after 185 days.

List of isotopes 

|-
|204Ac
|
| style="text-align:right" | 89
| style="text-align:right" | 115
|
| 
| α
| 200Fr
|
|
|-
|205Ac
|
| style="text-align:right" | 89
| style="text-align:right" | 116
|
| 
| α
| 201Fr
| 9/2−?
|
|-
| 206Ac
|
| style="text-align:right" | 89
| style="text-align:right" | 117
| 206.01450(8)
| 25(7) ms
| α
| 202Fr
| (3+)
|
|-
| style="text-indent:1em" | 206m1Ac
|
| colspan="3" style="text-indent:2em" | 80(50) keV
| 15(6) ms
| α
| 202Fr
|
|
|-
| style="text-indent:1em" | 206m2Ac
|
| colspan="3" style="text-indent:2em" | 290(110)# keV
| 41(16) ms
| α
| 202mFr
| (10−)
|
|-
| 207Ac
|
| style="text-align:right" | 89
| style="text-align:right" | 118
| 207.01195(6)
| 31(8) ms[27(+11−6) ms]
| α
| 203Fr
| 9/2−#
|
|-
| rowspan=2|208Ac
| rowspan=2|
| rowspan=2 style="text-align:right" | 89
| rowspan=2 style="text-align:right" | 119
| rowspan=2|208.01155(6)
| rowspan=2|97(16) ms[95(+24−16) ms]
| α (99%)
| 204Fr
| rowspan=2|(3+)
| rowspan=2|
|-
| β+ (1%)
| 208Ra
|-
| rowspan=3 style="text-indent:1em" | 208mAc
| rowspan=3|
| rowspan=3 colspan="3" style="text-indent:2em" | 506(26) keV
| rowspan=3|28(7) ms[25(+9−5) ms]
| α (89%)
| 204Fr
| rowspan=3|(10−)
| rowspan=3|
|-
| IT (10%)
| 208Ac
|-
| β+ (1%)
| 208Ra
|-
| rowspan=2|209Ac
| rowspan=2|
| rowspan=2 style="text-align:right" | 89
| rowspan=2 style="text-align:right" | 120
| rowspan=2|209.00949(5)
| rowspan=2|92(11) ms
| α (99%)
| 205Fr
| rowspan=2|(9/2−)
| rowspan=2|
|-
| β+ (1%)
| 209Ra
|-
| rowspan=2|210Ac
| rowspan=2|
| rowspan=2 style="text-align:right" | 89
| rowspan=2 style="text-align:right" | 121
| rowspan=2|210.00944(6)
| rowspan=2|350(40) ms
| α (96%)
| 206Fr
| rowspan=2|7+#
| rowspan=2|
|-
| β+ (4%)
| 210Ra
|-
| rowspan=2|211Ac
| rowspan=2|
| rowspan=2 style="text-align:right" | 89
| rowspan=2 style="text-align:right" | 122
| rowspan=2|211.00773(8)
| rowspan=2|213(25) ms
| α (99.8%)
| 207Fr
| rowspan=2|9/2−#
| rowspan=2| 
|-
| β+ (.2%)
| 211Ra
|-
| rowspan=2|212Ac
| rowspan=2|
| rowspan=2 style="text-align:right" | 89
| rowspan=2 style="text-align:right" | 123
| rowspan=2|212.00781(7)
| rowspan=2|920(50) ms
| α (97%)
| 208Fr
| rowspan=2|6+#
| rowspan=2|
|-
| β+ (3%)
| 212Ra
|-
| rowspan=2|213Ac
| rowspan=2|
| rowspan=2 style="text-align:right" | 89
| rowspan=2 style="text-align:right" | 124
| rowspan=2|213.00661(6)
| rowspan=2|731(17) ms
| α
| 209Fr
| rowspan=2|(9/2−)#
| rowspan=2|
|-
| β+ (rare)
| 213Ra
|-
| rowspan=2|214Ac
| rowspan=2|
| rowspan=2 style="text-align:right" | 89
| rowspan=2 style="text-align:right" | 125
| rowspan=2|214.006902(24)
| rowspan=2|8.2(2) s
| α (89%)
| 210Fr
| rowspan=2|(5+)#
| rowspan=2|
|-
| β+ (11%)
| 214Ra
|-
| rowspan=2|215Ac
| rowspan=2|
| rowspan=2 style="text-align:right" | 89
| rowspan=2 style="text-align:right" | 126
| rowspan=2|215.006454(23)
| rowspan=2|0.17(1) s
| α (99.91%)
| 211Fr
| rowspan=2|9/2−
| rowspan=2|
|-
| β+ (.09%)
| 215Ra
|-
| rowspan=2|216Ac
| rowspan=2|
| rowspan=2 style="text-align:right" | 89
| rowspan=2 style="text-align:right" | 127
| rowspan=2|216.008720(29)
| rowspan=2|0.440(16) ms
| α
| 212Fr
| rowspan=2|(1−)
| rowspan=2|
|-
| β+ (7×10−5%)
| 216Ra
|-
| style="text-indent:1em" | 216mAc
|
| colspan="3" style="text-indent:2em" | 44(7) keV
| 443(7) µs
|
|
| (9−)
|
|-
| rowspan=2|217Ac
| rowspan=2|
| rowspan=2 style="text-align:right" | 89
| rowspan=2 style="text-align:right" | 128
| rowspan=2|217.009347(14)
| rowspan=2|69(4) ns
| α (98%)
| 213Fr
| rowspan=2|9/2−
| rowspan=2|
|-
| β+ (6.9×10−9%)
| 217Ra
|-
| style="text-indent:1em" | 217mAc
|
| colspan="3" style="text-indent:2em" | 2012(20) keV
| 740(40) ns
|
|
| (29/2)+
|
|-
| 218Ac
|
| style="text-align:right" | 89
| style="text-align:right" | 129
| 218.01164(5)
| 1.08(9) µs
| α
| 214Fr
| (1−)#
|
|-
| style="text-indent:1em" | 218mAc
|
| colspan="3" style="text-indent:2em" | 584(50)# keV
| 103(11) ns
|
|
| (11+)
|
|-
| rowspan=2|219Ac
| rowspan=2|
| rowspan=2 style="text-align:right" | 89
| rowspan=2 style="text-align:right" | 130
| rowspan=2|219.01242(5)
| rowspan=2|11.8(15) µs
| α
| 215Fr
| rowspan=2|9/2−
| rowspan=2|
|-
| β+ (10−6%)
| 219Ra
|-
| rowspan=2|220Ac
| rowspan=2|
| rowspan=2 style="text-align:right" | 89
| rowspan=2 style="text-align:right" | 131
| rowspan=2|220.014763(16)
| rowspan=2|26.36(19) ms
| α
| 216Fr
| rowspan=2|(3−)
| rowspan=2|
|-
| β+ (5×10−4%)
| 220Ra
|-
| 221Ac
|
| style="text-align:right" | 89
| style="text-align:right" | 132
| 221.01559(5)
| 52(2) ms
| α
| 217Fr
| 9/2−#
|
|-
| rowspan=2|222Ac
| rowspan=2|
| rowspan=2 style="text-align:right" | 89
| rowspan=2 style="text-align:right" | 133
| rowspan=2|222.017844(6)
| rowspan=2|5.0(5) s
| α (99%)
| 218Fr
| rowspan=2|1−
| rowspan=2|
|-
| β+ (1%)
| 222Ra
|-
| rowspan=3 style="text-indent:1em" | 222mAc
| rowspan=3|
| rowspan=3 colspan="3" style="text-indent:2em" | 200(150)# keV
| rowspan=3|1.05(7) min
| α (88.6%)
| 218Fr
| rowspan=3|high
| rowspan=3|
|-
| IT (10%)
| 222Ac
|-
| β+ (1.4%)
| 222Ra
|-
| rowspan=3|223Ac
| rowspan=3|
| rowspan=3 style="text-align:right" | 89
| rowspan=3 style="text-align:right" | 134
| rowspan=3|223.019137(8)
| rowspan=3|2.10(5) min
| α (99%)
| 219Fr
| rowspan=3|(5/2−)
| rowspan=3|
|-
| EC (1%)
| 223Ra
|-
| CD (3.2×10−9%)
| 209Bi14C
|-
| rowspan=3|224Ac
| rowspan=3|
| rowspan=3 style="text-align:right" | 89
| rowspan=3 style="text-align:right" | 135
| rowspan=3|224.021723(4)
| rowspan=3|2.78(17) h
| β+ (90.9%)
| 224Ra
| rowspan=3|0−
| rowspan=3|
|-
| α (9.1%)
| 220Fr
|-
| β− (1.6%)
| 224Th
|-
| rowspan=2|225Ac
| rowspan=2|
| rowspan=2 style="text-align:right" | 89
| rowspan=2 style="text-align:right" | 136
| rowspan=2|225.023230(5)
| rowspan=2|10.0(1) d
| α
| 221Fr
| rowspan=2|(3/2−)
| rowspan=2|Trace
|-
| CD (6×10−10%)
| 211Bi14C
|-
| rowspan=3|226Ac
| rowspan=3|
| rowspan=3 style="text-align:right" | 89
| rowspan=3 style="text-align:right" | 137
| rowspan=3|226.026098(4)
| rowspan=3|29.37(12) h
| β− (83%)
| 226Th
| rowspan=3|(1)(−#)
| rowspan=3|
|-
| EC (17%)
| 226Ra
|-
| α (.006%)
| 222Fr
|-
| rowspan=2|227Ac
| rowspan=2|Actinium
| rowspan=2 style="text-align:right" | 89
| rowspan=2 style="text-align:right" | 138
| rowspan=2|227.0277521(26)
| rowspan=2|21.772(3) y
| β− (98.61%)
| 227Th
| rowspan=2|3/2−
| rowspan=2|Trace
|-
| α (1.38%)
| 223Fr
|-
| rowspan=2|228Ac
| rowspan=2|Mesothorium 2
| rowspan=2 style="text-align:right" | 89
| rowspan=2 style="text-align:right" | 139
| rowspan=2|228.0310211(27)
| rowspan=2|6.13(2) h
| β−
| 228Th
| rowspan=2|3+
| rowspan=2|Trace
|-
| α (5.5×10−6%)
| 224Fr
|-
| 229Ac
|
| style="text-align:right" | 89
| style="text-align:right" | 140
| 229.03302(4)
| 62.7(5) min
| β−
| 229Th
| (3/2+)
|
|-
| 230Ac
|
| style="text-align:right" | 89
| style="text-align:right" | 141
| 230.03629(32)
| 122(3) s
| β−
| 230Th
| (1+)
|
|-
| 231Ac
|
| style="text-align:right" | 89
| style="text-align:right" | 142
| 231.03856(11)
| 7.5(1) min
| β−
| 231Th
| (1/2+)
|
|-
| 232Ac
|
| style="text-align:right" | 89
| style="text-align:right" | 143
| 232.04203(11)
| 119(5) s
| β−
| 232Th
| (1+)
|
|-
| 233Ac
|
| style="text-align:right" | 89
| style="text-align:right" | 144
| 233.04455(32)#
| 145(10) s
| β−
| 233Th
| (1/2+)
|
|-
| 234Ac
|
| style="text-align:right" | 89
| style="text-align:right" | 145
| 234.04842(43)#
| 44(7) s
| β−
| 234Th
|
|
|-
| 235Ac
|
| style="text-align:right" | 89
| style="text-align:right" | 146
| 235.05123(38)#
| 60(4) s
| β−
| 235Th
| 1/2+#
|
|-
| 236Ac
|
| style="text-align:right" | 89
| style="text-align:right" | 147
| 236.05530(54)#
| 
| β−
| 236Th
|
|

Actinides vs fission products

See also 
 Actinium series
 Actinide

References 

 Isotope masses from:

 Isotopic compositions and standard atomic masses from:

 Half-life, spin, and isomer data selected from the following sources.

 
Actinium
Actinium